The Sula scops owl (Otus sulaensis),  is a small owl in the scops-owl genus Otus found on the Sula Islands of Indonesia.  Taxonomically, some groups consider it to be a distinct species (Otus sulensis), others a subspecies of the Sulawesi scops owl, and yet others a subspecies of the Moluccan scops owl.

References

Sula scops owl
Birds of the Sula Islands
Sula scops owl